Warrensburg station is an Amtrak train station serving the city of Warrensburg, Missouri. The current station originally opened in 1890 by the Missouri Pacific Railroad, and is built out of sandstone in the Richardsonian Romanesque style.  It has seen several remodels and enlargements the most recent major change being in 1984 when the baggage section and loading platform were added.

The station houses the Warrensburg Chamber of Commerce visitors center.

Service 
There are currently two trains daily to and from Kansas City, and two trains daily to and from St. Louis.

Other locations are available with connections at the Kansas City and St. Louis terminals.  Service to Los Angeles can be obtained through a connection at Kansas City through the Southwest Chief. San Antonio service is available with a connection at St. Louis through the Texas Eagle. Connections to Chicago  are available in Kansas City via Southwest Chief and St. Louis via Lincoln Service trains.

Amtrak completed a $2.6 million improvement project to the station in the early-2020s.

See also 
List of Amtrak stations

References

External links 

Warrensburg, MO – Texas Eagle (Amtrak)
Warrensburg, MO – USA Rail Guide (TrainWeb)

Amtrak stations in Missouri
Railway stations in the United States opened in 1890
Warrensburg, Missouri
Former Missouri Pacific Railroad stations
Buildings and structures in Johnson County, Missouri